Slam Dunk Records or Slam Dunk Music is a British independent record label, promoter and concert organising company, founded in Leeds, England, in 2007. Some notable signees include You Me at Six and Decade. The label evolved from "Slam Dunk", a weekly club night held at the city's Cockpit music venue, centered on emo, punk, ska and metal music. They have organised and promoted concerts for Leeds venues such as the Key Club, Leeds University Stylus, Leeds Beckett University Student Union and the First Direct Arena, as well as venues in other cities such as The Dome Leisure Centre, National Exhibition Centre and Hatfield Forum.

Slam Dunk Festival

The label is also associated with the Slam Dunk Festival, established in 2006. Although initially small-scale and set up with only a handful of artists, the yearly event now attracts many well-known artists and has slowly established itself as a popular indoor day-long music festival.  Initially held in the city's Millennium Square, the event moved to the student union of the University of Leeds in its second year.

The festival attracts more than 40 bands across six different stages. Notable acts which have played at the festival include Fall Out Boy, Thursday, You Me at Six, Hundred Reasons, Reel Big Fish and Paramore.

In 2010, a southern counterpart to the festival had its first year in the University of Hertfordshire, and the now two-day festival became known as Slam Dunk North (Leeds) and Slam Dunk South (Hertfordshire). The festival is normally held on the May Bank Holiday of each year, featuring a mixture of up-and-coming and more established bands, based around punk/emo/metal and ska music.

Leeds Millennium Square 2006

27 May 2007 – Leeds University

25 May 2008 – Leeds University

24 May 2009 – Leeds University

29/30 May 2010 – Hertfordshire University / Leeds University

19/20 May 2011 – Leeds University/Hatfield

26/27 May 2012 – Leeds University/Hatfield

Slam Dunk Festival 2013
The festival was expanded to be a three date festival in England, where all three dates featured the same lineup. Three minor dates were spun off it, one in Wales, one in Scotland and one in Northern Ireland.

Slam Dunk Festival 2014
The 2014 Festival was held at the same three locations as 2013: Leeds (24 May), Hatfield (25 May) and Wolverhampton (May26th). There was also a smaller lineup in Edinburgh (23 May) and Newport, Wales (27 May).

On 29 April it was announced that Goldfinger had withdrawn from the festival. The band were replaced by The Ataris. On 25 May, it was announced that Landscapes had withdrawn from the festival for both Hatfield and Wolverhampton dates. They were replaced by Great Cynics at Hatfield and Aurora for Wolverhampton.

Slam Dunk Festival 2015
The 2015 Festival was held at the same three locations as the last two years: Leeds (23 May), Hatfield (24 May) and Wolverhampton (25 May). The Leeds event was moved from Leeds University to Leeds City Centre.

Slam Dunk Festival 2016
The 2016 Festival was held at the same locations as last year for the North and South dates, however the Midlands date had now been moved to the National Exhibition Centre in Birmingham.

Slam Dunk Festival 2017
The 2017 Festival was held at the same locations as last year for the all three dates

Slam Dunk Festival 2018
The 2018 Festival was held at the same North and Midlands locations as last year, however the South date was moved to Hatfield Park.

Slam Dunk Festival 2019
The 2019 Festival was reduced to two days.  The North festival was held at Temple Newsam Park on 25 May, and the South festival was held at Hatfield Park on 26 May.

Slam Dunk Festival 2021
The 2020 Festival was to be held at the same two venues as the 2019 festival. The festival was originally scheduled for the North festival to be held at Temple Newsam Park on 23 May, and the South festival will be held at Hatfield Park on 24 May. However the COVID-19 pandemic led to North being rescheduled to 5 September and South to 6 September. On 14 May, Slam Dunk announced that the festival will no longer be held in 2020 although the festival is expected and scheduled to return on 4 and 5 September 2021.

Slam Dunk Festival 2022
The North festival was held at Temple Newsam Park on 3 June, and the South festival was held at Hatfield Park on 4 June.

The Used, The Mighty Mighty Bosstones, Motion City Soundtrack and Spanish Love Songs were all due to play the festival but cancelled. 

Alexisonfire's set time was adjusted to avoid clashes with Sum 41 after The Used's withdrawal.
The Mighty Mighty Bosstones were replaced by Streetlight Manifesto and Suicide Machines.
The Wonder Years played two sets, performing both The Upsides and Surburbia in replacement of Motion City Soundtrack.

Slam Dunk Festival 2023 
The South Festival will be held at the Hatfield Park on 27 May, and the North festival will be held at Temple Newsam Park on 28 May.

The Key Club
The Key Club is a live music venue and nightclub in the Merrion Centre, Leeds that is owned by Slam Dunk Records. It has a 300-person capacity, is the successor to The Cockpit, and hosts many events that the Cockpit did such as Slam Dunk and the Garage club nights. It is advertised as the "first pure rock venue in Leeds". Some bands who have played at the Key Club include Fit for an Autopsy, Blood Youth, Cancer Bats, Beartooth, Frank Carter and the Rattlesnakes, Idles and The Wonder Years.

References
Footnotes

Citations

British independent record labels